The polycystines are a group of radiolarians. They include the vast majority of the fossil radiolaria, as their skeletons are abundant in marine sediments, making them one of the most common groups of microfossils.  These skeletons are composed of opaline silica.  In some it takes the form of relatively simple spicules, but in others it forms more elaborate lattices, such as concentric spheres with radial spines or sequences of conical chambers. Two of the orders belonging to this group are the radially-symmetrical Spumellaria, dating back to the late Cambrian period, and the bilaterally-symmetrical Nasselaria, whose origin is placed within the lower Devonian.

References

External links 
 
 
 Radiolaria.org
 

Taxa named by Christian Gottfried Ehrenberg